Bithynia tentaculata, common names the mud bithynia or common bithynia, or faucet snail is a relatively small species of freshwater snail with gills and an operculum, an aquatic prosobranch gastropod mollusk in the family Bithyniidae.

Taxonomy
Bithynia tentaculata is the type species of the genus Bithynia.

Forms of Bithynia tentaculata include:
 Bithynia tentaculata f. codia
 Bithynia tentaculata f. excavata
 Bithynia tentaculata f. gigas
 Bithynia tentaculata f. producta Menke, 1828
 † Bithynia tentaculata tellinii Sacco, 1886

The variety  † Bithynia tentaculata var. allobrogica Fontannes, 1881: synonym of  † Bithynia minor Locard, 1878

Distribution

Indigenous distribution
The distribution of Bithynia tentaculata is Palearctic. The species occurs in:

Northern Europe:
 Scandinavia

Central Europe:
 Czech Republic – least concern (LC)
 Germany – common species overall in Germany, but is listed as endangered (gefährdet) in Saxony and in Thuringia
 Poland
 Slovakia

Western Europe:
 British Isles: Great Britain and Ireland
 Netherlands

Eastern Europe:
 Ukraine

Southeastern Europe:
 Bulgaria – There is southern distribution border of Bithynia tentaculata in northern Bulgaria.
 Croatia

Bithynia tentaculata has been mentioned from Greece, but it does not occur there. It probably does not occur in Turkey and in Iran.

Nonindigenous distribution
Bithynia tentaculata is nonindigenous in the United States and in Canada.

Great Lakes Region: Bithynia tentaculata was first recorded in Lake Michigan in 1871, but was probably introduced in 1870. It spread to Lake Ontario by 1879, the Hudson River by 1892, and other tributaries and water bodies in the Finger Lakes region during the 20th century. It was introduced to Lake Erie sometime before 1930. This snail's range extends in 1992 from Quebec and Wisconsin to Pennsylvania and New York. It has been recorded from Lake Huron, but only a few individuals were found in benthic samples from Saginaw Bay in the 1980s and 1990s.

In the Mid-Atlantic Region it is found in Lake Champlain, widespread across New York, Potomac River in Virginia. Established in Chesapeake Bay, Maryland (Ruiz 2000).

Description

The height of shell is usually no larger than 12–15 mm. The snail is sexually mature by the time the height of shell reaches 8 mm in size.

The width of the shell is 5–7 mm.

The faucet snail has a shiny pale brown shell, oval in shape, with a relatively large and rounded spire consisting of 5–6 somewhat flattened whorls, no umbilicus, and a very thick lip. The aperture is less than half the height of the shell.

Adult Bithynia tentaculata possess a white, calcareous, tear-drop to oval-shaped operculum with distinct concentric rings. The operculum of juveniles, however, is spirally marked. The operculum (on the back of the foot) is always situated very close to the aperture of the shell. The animal itself has pointed, long tentacles and a simple foot with the right cervical lobe acting as a channel for water.

Ecology

Habitat
This snail lives in slow-running freshwater habitat such as low-velocity rivers, and standing-water bodies such as lakes. The species flourishes in calcium-rich waters.

It is commonly found in freshwater ponds, shallow lakes, and canals. This species is found on the substrate in fall and winter (including gravel, sand, clay, mud or undersides of rocks) and on aquatic macrophytes (including milfoil, Myriophyllum spicatum and muskgrass, Chara spp.) in warmer months.
 It lives mostly in shoals, but is also found at depths of up to 5 m. Bithynia tentaculata inhabits intertidal zones in the Hudson River But in general, this snail inhabits waters with pH of 6.6–8.4, conductivity of 87–2320 μmhos/cm, Ca2+ of 5–89 ppm, and Na+ of 4–291 ppm. It can potentially survive well in water bodies with high concentrations of K+ and low concentrations of NO3−. In the Saint Lawrence River, it tends to occur in relatively unpolluted, nearshore areas and amongst dreissenid mussel beds.

Feeding habits
This species functions as both a scraper and a collector-filterer, grazing on algae on the substrate, as well as using its gills to filter suspended algae from the water column. When filter feeding, algae is sucked in, condensed, and then passed out between the right tentacle and exhalant siphon in pellet-like packages which are then eaten. The ability to filter feed may play a role in allowing populations of the faucet snail to survive at high densities in relatively eutrophic, anthropogenically influenced water bodies. Bithynia tentaculata feeds selectively on food items. The faucet snail is known in Eurasia to feed on black fly larvae.

Life cycle

Bithynia tentaculata is dioecious (it has two separate sexes) and lays its eggs on rocks, wood and shells in organized aggregates arranged in double rows, in clumps of 1 to 77. The density of eggs on the substrate can sometimes reach . Fecundity may reach up to 347 eggs and is greatest for the 2nd year class. Eggs hatch in three weeks to three months, depending on water temperature. Growth usually does not occur from September to May. The lifespan varies regionally and can be anywhere from 17 to 39 months.

The faucet snail has the potential to be a good biomonitor for contaminants such as Cd, Zn, and methylmercury (MeHg) because there are good correlations between environmental concentrations and snail tissue concentrations with respect to these toxic compounds.

Parasites
In its native Eurasian habitat, the faucet snail is host to many different species of digeneans, cercariae, metacercariae, cysticercoids, and other parasites.

 As first intermediate host for Prosthogonimus ovatus
 As an intermediate host for Sphaeridiotrema globulus
 As first intermediate hosts and as second intermediate host for Cyanthocotyle bushiensis.
 As second intermediate host for Echinostoma revolutum
 As intermediate host for Syngamus trachea
 Capillariidae, probably Capillaria obsignata
 Bithynia tenataculata is a suspected intermediate host for Leyogonimus polyoon

Parasites of Bithynia tentaculata include trematode Aspidogaster conchicola.

Other interspecific relationship
Natural dispersal of this snail is known to occur by passive transport in birds.

Bithynia tentaculata is capable of detecting the presence of molluscivorous leeches through chemoreception and of closing its operculum to avoid predation.

References
This article incorporates public domain text from the reference

External links

 Bithynia tentaculata at www.science.mcmaster.ca
 
 
 
 
 Bithynia tentaculata Species account and photograph at Mollusc Ireland.

Bithyniidae
Molluscs of Europe
Palearctic molluscs
Gastropods described in 1758
Taxa named by Carl Linnaeus